Shanin (also Romanized as Shanīn, Shanī’īn, Shenīn, and Shīnīyīn; also known as Shanin Dodangeh and Shīrīn) is a village in Dodangeh-ye Olya Rural District, Ziaabad District, Takestan County, Qazvin Province, Iran. At the 2006 census, its population was 301, in 88 families.

References 

Populated places in Takestan County